Annabel Juliet Eyres (born 4 February 1965) is a British international rower and artist.

Annabel Eyres was educated at the City of London School for Girls in London and Bryanston School in Dorset. She then studied at the Ruskin School of Drawing and Fine Art, University of Oxford, where she was a student at Pembroke College. During this time, she rowed for the Pembroke College Boat Club and the Oxford University Women's Boat Club, competing in the Oxford and Cambridge Women's Boat Race. She also rowed for the Tideway Scullers School and the Upper Thames Rowing Club.

Eyres competed in the women's double sculls event at the 1992 Summer Olympics. She was part of the coxless pairs with Joanne Gough that won the national title rowing for the British squad at the 1990 National Championships. She also completed in the 1989 World Rowing Championships women's quadruple sculls final and the 1991 World Rowing Championships women's double sculls final.

As well as rowing, Eyres has been an artist, producing prints and also paper cuts and collages, as well as painting, especially of rowing-related subjects. She helped form the company Rock the Boat, selling rowing-related items, including artworks. She has exhibited regularly in London, including at the Riverside Gallery, and Oxford, including as part of Oxfordshire Artweeks.

Annabel Ayers is married with a family.

References

External links
 
 Annabel Eyres website

1965 births
Living people
20th-century English women artists
21st-century English women artists
Rowers from Greater London
Alumni of Pembroke College, Oxford
Alumni of the Ruskin School of Art
Artists from London
British female rowers
English women painters
English printmakers
People educated at Bryanston School
People educated at the City of London School
People educated at the City of London School for Girls
Olympic rowers of Great Britain
Rowers at the 1992 Summer Olympics
Women printmakers
Women collage artists